Carroll William "Boardwalk" Brown (February 20, 1889 – February 8, 1977) was a Major League Baseball pitcher. He was born on February 20, 1889, in Woodbury, New Jersey, and attended Woodbury Junior-Senior High School. He batted and threw right-handed, and was 178 pounds. Boardwalk played three seasons with the Philadelphia Athletics in 1911–1913. In 1914 he played for both the A's and the New York Yankees and again in 1915 with the Yankees. In his career, Brown had a 38–40 record in 133 games with an ERA of 3.47 and 251 strikeouts.

References

External links

1889 births
1977 deaths
Major League Baseball pitchers
Baseball players from New Jersey
New York Yankees players
Philadelphia Athletics players
Sportspeople from Woodbury, New Jersey
New Britain Perfectos players
Waterbury Champs players
Memphis Chickasaws players
Woodbury Junior-Senior High School alumni